Three ships of the Royal Navy have been named HMS Hood after several members of the Hood family, who were notable naval officers:

 , a 91-gun second-rate ship of the line, originally laid down as HMS Edgar, but renamed in 1848 and launched in 1859. She was used for harbour service from 1872 and was sold in 1888.
 , a modified  launched in 1891 and sunk as a blockship in 1914

Battle honours
Ships named Hood have earned the following battle honours:
Bismarck, 1941

Notes

References

Royal Navy ship names